Welschneudorf is an Ortsgemeinde – a community belonging to a Verbandsgemeinde – and a Luftkurort (“air health resort”) in the Westerwaldkreis in Rhineland-Palatinate, Germany.

Geography

The community lies in the Lower Westerwald between Koblenz and Limburg an der Lahn in the Nassau Nature Park. Verbandsgemeinde of Montabaur, a kind of collective municipality. Its seat is in the like-named town.

History
In 1453, Welschneudorf had its first documentary mention as Nudorff. In 1817, it was burnt down by advancing French troops.

Politics

The municipal council is made up of 16 council members who were elected in a majority vote in a municipal election on 13 June 2004.

Economy and infrastructure

The nearest Autobahn interchange is Montabaur on the A 3 (Cologne–Frankfurt), some 11 km away. The nearest InterCityExpress stops are the railway stations at Montabaur on the Cologne-Frankfurt high-speed rail line and Koblenz on the Linke Rheinstrecke.

References

External links
Welschneudorf in the collective municipality’s Web pages 

Municipalities in Rhineland-Palatinate
Westerwaldkreis